Jollo was an online machine translation service where users could instantly translate texts into 23 languages, request human translations from a community of volunteers around the world and compare the correctness of several leading machine translation websites. It was discontinued sometime in 2012.

System 
Jollo was a free Web 2.0 website that attempted to improve the way in which people translate online through the use of existing machine translation websites and a community of volunteers who correct and rate translations. The system relied on a similar methodology as computer-assisted translation to ensure translation quality, and featured a public translation memory that records past translations.

Jollo received some notable media attention, including in The Daily Telegraph. According to the popular blog KillerStartups  Jollo combined the best of two worlds - the speed of machine translations plus the benefit of human reviews to ensure translation quality. According to blogger Jeffrey Hill from The English Blog  the community features made Jollo an interesting alternative to other online translation services.

Development 
The Jollo website was classified as beta.

Jollo was developed using LAMP and had been praised for its colorful graphics and simple user interface.

Jollo offered a simple web-based API that could be used for translations. For example, the URL: http://www.jollo.com/translate.php?st=I%20love%20you&sl=en&tl=zh was used to translate the sentence "I love you" from English into Chinese.

References

External links 
Archive of the Jollo page

Machine translation
Internet properties disestablished in 2012